Lathaniel Alanzo Rowe-Turner (born 12 November 1989) is an English semi-professional footballer who plays as a defender for  club Nuneaton Borough.

Career

Leicester City
Born in Leicester, Leicestershire, Rowe-Turner started his career in the Leicester City academy.

On 16 October 2008, Rowe-Turner joined League One club Cheltenham Town on a one-month loan, linking up again with former Leicester manager Martin Allen. He made his professional debut and only appearance in a 2–0 away defeat to Tranmere Rovers on 21 October 2008, playing the entire match.

On 23 February 2009, Rowe-Turner joined Redditch United on a one-month loan.

On 18 September 2009, Rowe-Turner joined King's Lynn on a one-month loan.

Torquay United
On 1 February 2010, Rowe-Turner signed for League Two club Torquay United for an undisclosed fee. On 21 May 2012, Rowe-Turner was released by Torquay after spending two years at the club, in which he made 42 appearances and scored one goal.

Luton Town
On 2 July 2012, Rowe-Turner signed for Conference Premier club Luton Town on a two-year contract, linking back up with manager Paul Buckle who had worked with Rowe-Turner at Torquay United. Buckle left the club in February 2013 and his replacement John Still placed Rowe-Turner on the transfer list two months later. Rowe-Turner finished 2012–13 with 48 appearances and played in Luton's 1–0 FA Cup victory over Premier League team Norwich City. He went on trial with League Two club Burton Albion in July 2013.

Alfreton Town
On 2 September 2013, transfer deadline day, he joined Luton's Conference Premier rivals Alfreton Town on loan until 2 January 2014. Rowe-Turner's loan at Alfreton was extended by a further month on 3 January 2014. However, the loan was cut short after Luton recalled him. Rowe-Turner rejoined Alfreton on loan on 21 March 2014 until the end of 2013–14. He finished the season with 33 appearances as Alfreton finished 11th in the Conference Premier. Rowe-Turner left Luton by mutual consent in May 2014 after he was released from the final two months of his contract, before signing for Alfreton permanently in July.

Kidderminster Harriers
On 22 June 2015, Rowe-Turner signed for National League club Kidderminster Harriers for 2015–16.

Return to Torquay United
On 24 June 2016, Rowe-Turner re-signed for Torquay United as a replacement for the outgoing Dan Butler.

Chester
On 12 June 2017, Rowe-Turner signed for Torquay's National League rivals Chester on a one-year contract. He was released at the end of the season.

Kettering Town
Rowe-Turner signed for Southern League Premier Division Central club Kettering Town on 5 August 2018 on a one-year contract after a successful trial.

Tamworth
Rowe-Turner signed for another Southern League Premier Division Central club, Tamworth, on 11 June 2019. He made his debut for the club on 10 August in a 1–1 draw away to St Ives Town. Rowe-Turner made 38 appearances in all competitions before the 2019–20 season was abandoned and results expunged because of the COVID-19 pandemic in England. He committed to a second season with Tamworth on 1 July 2020.

Lathaniel signed a deal to remain with Tamworth for a third season on 8 June 2021.

Stourbridge
On 7 July 2021, he left Tamworth to sign for Southern League Premier Division rivals Stourbridge on a free transfer.

Career statistics

Honours
Kettering Town
Southern League Premier Division Central: 2018–19

References

1989 births
Living people
Footballers from Leicester
English footballers
Association football defenders
Leicester City F.C. players
Cheltenham Town F.C. players
Redditch United F.C. players
King's Lynn F.C. players
Torquay United F.C. players
Luton Town F.C. players
Alfreton Town F.C. players
Kidderminster Harriers F.C. players
Nuneaton Borough F.C. players
Chester F.C. players
Kettering Town F.C. players
Tamworth F.C. players
Stourbridge F.C. players
English Football League players
National League (English football) players
Northern Premier League players
Southern Football League players